Kossuth Lajos Square, also known as Kossuth Square, is a city square situated in the Lipótváros neighbourhood of Budapest, Hungary, on the bank of the Danube. Its most notable landmark is the Hungarian Parliament Building. There is a station of the M2 (East-West) line of the Budapest Metro on the square as well as a stop for the scenic Tram No. 2.

Name and history 
The square, renamed in 1927 in honour of Lajos Kossuth, was previously known by several names including; Országház tér ("Parliament Square") (1898–1927), Tömő tér or Stadt Schopper Platz in German ("Landfill Square") (1853–1898). This name recalls how the low-lying territory flanking the river, then outside the town of Pest, was filled with rubbish to raise the level of the ground. The first recorded name was Stadtischer Auswind Platz ("Unloading Square for the Ships") in 1820.

In the second half of the 19th century, great public buildings were erected on the square and it became the symbolic centre of the Hungarian state. The Hungarian Parliament Building is located on the square.

Facing the parliament building is the Museum of Ethnography (originally the Palace of Justice) and the Ministry of Agriculture.

After World War II, a temporary bridge across the Danube, Kossuth híd, was built between Lajos Kossuth Square and Batthyány Square, and functioned from 1946 until 1960. It was dismantled when most of the permanent bridges were re-built. It is marked with memorial stones on the Pest and the Buda sides.  In its place, a pontoon bridge was built in 1973 and in 2003, for a few days around national holidays.

From 17 September 2006 Kossuth Square was the scene of the great anti-government demonstrations against Prime Minister Ferenc Gyurcsány triggered by the release of Gyurcsány's speech in which he confessed that he had lied to win the 2006 elections. Until 23 October the square was continuously occupied by the demonstrators.

After the 23 October riots the police closed off the square with cordons. The long closure of square caused controversy. The cordons were removed only on 19 March 2007. The damaged park was subsequently restored and the square was given back to the public.

The square was closed again in 2012 by a decision of the Parliament in order to restore its original, pre-1944 view. The square was reopened in 2014 as a traffic-free zone with a sustainable park, updated tracks for tram No. 2, an underground parking garage, sculptures, and a memorial to the victims of the Kossuth Tér massacre on 25 October 1956.

Memorials
In front of the Parliament building are the Kossuth Memorial and an equestrian statue of Francis II Rákóczi, as well as a memorial for the 1956 Hungarian Revolution. A modern statue of Attila József is nearby, south of the Parliament, sitting on the bank of the river (actually he is sitting on a grassy mound quite far from the water) as described in his poem By the Danube. There are reconstructed memorials of Count István Tisza and Count Gyula Andrássy on both side of the Hungarian Parliament Building. On 28 December 2018, the statue of Imre Nagy, inaugurated in 1996 was removed from the square to Jászai Mari Square, in order to make way to reconstruct the Monument to the National Martyrs, that had stood on location from 1934 to 1945.

The Kossuth Tér Massacre Memorial
A memorial to the victims of the 25 October 1956 massacre at Kossuth tér was created in the southern ventilation tunnel as part of the 2012-2014 reconstruction of the square. The memorial remembers the unarmed victims who gathered on this "Bloody Thursday" as part of the 1956 Hungarian Revolution with videos, photos, candles, and memorabilia of the era. Little information is certain about this massacre, from who fired the first shot and why to how the protesters were led to gather in that location on that day to the death toll of the event. Sources cite as few as 22 shot dead up to as many as 1000. British officials cite the number as being between 300 and 800. The memorial asks anyone with information on the massacre to report it to officials to help complete the story.

References

Squares in Budapest
National squares